The 11th "Lubuska" Armoured Cavalry Division is an armoured division of the Polish Land Forces, which traces its history to the formation of the 11th Infantry Division of the Polish Armed Forces in the East in 1945.

History 
The 11th Armoured Cavalry Division draws its history in a straight line from the formation in March and April 1945, in the region of Łódź of the 11th Infantry Division.

In March 1949, on the basis of the 11th Infantry Division, the 6th Tank Regiment, and the 25th Armored Artillery Regiment, the 11th Motorised Infantry Division was formed. The division became a part of the 2nd Armoured Corps. The 11th Motorised Infantry Division was authorized 10,028 soldiers, 76 medium tanks, 21 assault guns, 5 armoured cars, 73 76-mm artillery pieces, 26 122-mm howitzers, 90 82-mm mortars, and 60 120-mm mortars. This unit was structured and quartered as:

In 1950 the division was reorganized as the 11th "Dresden" Mechanised Division, and authorized 7,636 soldiers, 138 medium tanks, 19 assault guns, 15 armoured cars, 26 122-mm howitzers, 40 76-mm artillery pieces, nine 57-mm antitank guns, 21 37-mm anti-aircraft guns, 40 82-mm mortars, and 54 120-mm mortars.  On September 4, 1956, the 2nd Armoured Corps headquarters stood down and the 11th Division was subordinated to the command of the Silesian Military District. This iteration was structured and quartered as:

In summer 1957 the reorganization of the division was carried out, and in April 1963 it reorganized as the 11th Armoured Division.  In August and September 1968, the 11th Armoured Division was one of the Polish units that took part in the Warsaw Pact invasion of Czechoslovakia. The 11th Armoured Division was structured and quartered as:

In 1990 the division was reorganized as the 11th Mechanised Division. In September 1991 the division lost the distinguished name "Dresden". In July 1992, the type-designation "armoured cavalry" was granted, although the division was eventually restructured as a regular armoured division. The new type designation recalled the service of pre-war and Second World War Western Front Polish armoured units. The designation "armoured cavalry" and unit badge depicting a black hussar wing and helmet reference the historical winged hussars, the Polish heavy shock cavalry from the 16th to 18th centuries. The Division's patron Jan III Sobieski personally led the winged hussars at the Battle of Vienna in 1683 and the Division inherited the battle honour Vienna 1683, inscribed on the unit's commemorative badge, in 1989.

Current structure 

As of 2020, the division is organised in this manner:

  11th Armoured Cavalry Division
  Divisional Headquarters and 11th Headquarters Battalion in Żagań
 10th Armoured Cavalry Brigade in Świętoszów
  17th Mechanized Brigade in Międzyrzecz
  34th Armoured Cavalry Brigade in Żagań
  4th Anti-Aircraft Regiment in Czerwieńsk
  23rd Artillery Regiment in Bolesławiec
 11th Logistic Regiment in Żagań

Notes

Bibliography 
 Wiesław Chłopek, 11 Lubuska Dywizja Kawalerii Pancernej im. Króla Jana III Sobieskiego. Zarys dziejów, Wydawnictwo "Chroma", Żary 2005, wyd. I, 
 Zdzisław Sawicki, Mundur i odznaki Wojska Polskiego. Czas przemian, Warszawa: Bellona, 1997

External links
11 Lubuska Armoured Cavalry Division 
Map locating division units

Armoured divisions of Poland
Military units and formations established in 1949